The Ceylon Electricity Board - CEB, is the largest electricity company in Sri Lanka. With a market share of nearly 100%, it controls all major functions of electricity generation, transmission, distribution and retailing in Sri Lanka. It is one of the only two on-grid electricity companies in the country; the other being Lanka Electricity Company (LECO). The company earned approximately Rs 204.7 billion in 2014, with a total of nearly 5.42 million consumer accounts.
It is a government owned and controlled utility of Sri Lanka that takes care of the general energy facilities of the island. The Ministry of Power and Energy is the responsible ministry above the CEB. Ceylon Electricity Board (CEB), established by an CEB Act No. 17 of 1969, is under legal obligation to develop and maintain an efficient, coordinated and economical system of Electricity supply in accordance with any Licenses issue.

Subsidiaries
CEB has following subsidiaries
 Lanka Electricity Company
 LTL Holdings (Pvt) Ltd  
 Lanka Coal Company Ltd 
 Sri Lanka Energies (Pvt) Ltd (100% subsidiary of CEB)
 Trincomalee Power Company Limited (Joint Venture)

Electricity Generation

Hydro power
Electricity generation by CEB is primarily done by hydro power. Hydro power is the oldest and most dependent source of electricity generation, taking a share of nearly 42% of the total available grid capacity in December 2014, and 37% of power generated in 2014. Hydropower generation facilities has been constantly under development since the introduction of the national grid, but is currently declining due to the exhaustion of the resource.

In 2014, then Media Spokesperson at the CEB, Senajith Dassanayake said the generation of hydro power has dropped to 37%; as a result, 60 percent of the electricity needs have to be fulfilled by thermal energy.

Thermal Power
The Norocholai Coal Power Station, the only coal-fired power station in the country is owned by CEB; it was commissioned in late-2011 and finished in 2014, under loans from Export-Import Bank of China. It added further  of electrical capacity to the grid. The Sampur Coal Power Station, is currently under consideration in Trincomalee.

Coal Power Development
In 2011, Ceylon Electricity Board opened a new coal power plant named Puttalam Lakvijaya. On 13 February 2011 it was synchronized with the system.

On 17 September 2014, US$1.35 billion coal-fired Norochcholai Power Station was commissioned by the Chinese President Xi Jinping on his visit to Sri Lanka. The Export-Import Bank of China provided a US$450 million loan for the first 300 megawatt unit at the power plant. The power plant was officially commenced on 16 September 2014.

Wind Power Development 
CEB launched Sri Lanka largest wind farm Thambapavani added to national grid. Project stated in 2014. Power station generate more than 100 MW.

Controversies

Blackouts and shutdowns

In October 2010, during a test run, a fire broke out in the chimney due to clogging. Splits in the cooling system piping triggered a shutdown down of the power plant. The Ceylon Electricity Board decided to institute blackouts to households and Industries for three hours a day until the fault is fully repaired.
In December 2013, more leaks were discovered in the cooling system, the CEB decided that the plant was too dangerous to operate at the moment. The CEB requested assistance from CMEC, and the company said that it would take about six weeks to fix the faults. After negotiations, the plant was repaired by CMEC and brought back online. A day later it failed once more and was shut down again for six more days.
In 2014, then Minister of Power and Energy, Pavithra Wanniarachchi, revealed that the Norochcholai power plant had been offline for 271 days out of the 1086 days since it had been operating.
On 25 February 2016, the entire country of Sri Lanka experienced a 3-hour blackout due to a lightning striking the national power grid.
On 13 March 2016, Sri Lanka experienced another 7 hour island wide blackout due to a damaged transformer in the 220 kV substation at Biyagama. It is considered to be the worst nationwide power outage in 20 years. Ex- Prime Minister Ranil Wickremesinghe appointed a five-member committee to investigate the blackout. Due to initial suspicions of sabotage, Ex- President Maithripala Sirisena deployed troops to guard electrical installations until the investigation was completed. The CEB also reported that the outage caused Lakvijaya Coal Power Plant to fail, resulting in a loss of 900 Mega Watts to the National Grid. On March 23, 2016, Power and Renewable Energy Minister Ranjith Siyambalapitiya notified parliament that the reason for the power outage was a lack of regular maintenance of power installations. The engineer in charge of the Biyagama Substation had previously reported that a key transformer needed maintenance; however, no repairs were made.

2019 electricity crisis 

In March 2019, the CEB decided to impose four-hour rolling power  cut on a scheduled basis throughout Sri Lanka after the national grid capacity failed to meet the increased demand for power due to dry climate, and due to limited power generation.

Losses
Ceylon Electricity Board has lost 25.5 billion rupees in 2011, and run up debts of 121 billion rupees with a petroleum distributor and independent power producers.

In 2012, the CEB lost 61.2 billion rupees and the Ceylon Petroleum Corporation which supplied fuel below cost 89.7 billion rupees. To cover up the loss, the CEB increased power tariffs in large scales. The CEB expected to get revenues of 223 billion rupees—or 45 billion rupees more than the earlier tariff—from the price hike, but subsequently lost 33 billion rupees in 2013 on total expenses of 256 billion rupees.

On 16 September 2014, after officially opening a completed $1.35 billion Chinese-financed 900 MW coal power plant project, Sri Lankan President at the time, Mahinda Rajapaksa addressed the nation saying that the electricity bills of the people will be reduced by 25%. The CEB stated that it will take about two weeks to come up with a process of creating electricity bills to reflect the reduction in prices.

Employee Tax
The CEB has been accused of Tax fraud by the Campaign for Free and Fair Elections (CaFFE), which has claimed that CEB has not deducted PAYE from its engineers and senior staff since 2010 amounting to Rs. 3465 million. CaFFE has claimed that this amount has been recovered from the consumer instead.

Restructuring 
A restructuring committee was appointed as per the approval of the Cabinet of Ministers to submit proposals to restructure the CEB within a month. Committee members consisted of former and current administrative officers of the Sri Lankan Government Service.

See also 
 Electricity sector in Sri Lanka
 India Sri Lanka HVDC Interconnection
 List of power stations in Sri Lanka

References

External links
 
 

Electric power companies of Sri Lanka
State owned commercial corporations of Sri Lanka
Public utilities of Sri Lanka
Sri Lankan companies established in 1969
Energy companies established in 1969
Public utilities established in 1969